Marlborough is a residential neighbourhood in the northeast quadrant of Calgary, Alberta. It is bounded by the 16 Avenue NE (Trans-Canada Highway) to the north, 52 Street NE to the east, Memorial Drive to the south and 36 Street NE to the west.

The community is served by the Marlborough station of the C-Train LRT system, and Marlborough Mall is located in the southwest corner of the neighbourhood. 

Marlborough was established in 1967, and was named after Marlborough, England. It is represented in the Calgary City Council by the Ward 10 councillor.

The community is very diverse and has residents from a variety of cultural backgrounds. There is a significantly large Black, Filipino, Arab and Chinese population in the neighbourhood.  

The postal code in this area is T2A.

History
The northwest corner of the district was largely undeveloped when the community was first developed; a small motel was in existence on the southeast corner of 16th Avenue and 36th Street NE and a large open field was used for industrial/oilfield storage into the 1970s. The creation of a clover leaf exchange in the early 1970s at that intersection saw the motel demolished. In the 1990s, the final major residential development occurred as houses were added to the western portion of Marlyn Way.

Community 
To provide community facilities and services to the residents of Marlborough, the Calgary Marlborough Community Association is a volunteer organization that represents the interests and meets the needs of the residents within the Community. Although everyone is welcome to attend community events, purchased memberships to the Community Association are often encouraged - programs, activities and events on a weekly or monthly basis for members will be at a smaller cost compared to non-members. Membership costs: Family Memberships-$20/year, Single Memberships-$10/year.

Demographics

Residents in this community had a median household income of $53,921 in 2000, and there were 17.1% low income residents living in the neighbourhood. As of 2000, 30.1% of the residents were immigrants. A proportion of 17% of the buildings were condominiums or apartments, and 27.8% of the housing was used for renting.

Marlborough's population distribution by age in 2014
0-4 years: 6% 
5-14 years: 10%  
15-19 years: 5%  
20-64 years: 65%  
65+ years: 13%

Education

Public Schools

High School Out Reach Programs 
 Discovering Choices

Junior high schools 
 Bob Edwards Junior High

Elementary schools 
 Chris Akkerman Elementary 
 Marlborough Elementary  
 St. Mark Elementary School(catholic)

Day Care Centres
 BrightPath Marlborough
 Marlborough Day Nursery LTD.

See also
List of neighbourhoods in Calgary

References

External links
Marlborough Community Association

Neighbourhoods in Calgary